Ann-Kristin Achleitner ( Koberg) is a German economist, currently a professor at Technical University of Munich.

Career 
Before taking on her current position, Achleitner held an Endowed Chair for Banking and Finance at EBS University of Business and Law from 1995 to 2001 and Honorary Professor at EBS from 2002 to 2013. She is a member of acatech.

In addition, Achleiter serves on the Government Commission on the German Corporate Governance Codex and on the Economic Council of the Embassy of France in Berlin. In her hometown Munich, she shares an office with her husband Paul Achleitner, Michael Diekmann, Joachim Faber and Peter Löscher.

Other activities

Corporate boards 
 Investcorp, Member of the International Advisory Board (since 2018)
 Munich Re, Member of the supervisory board (since 2013)
 Engie, Member of the Board of Directors (since 2012), Chair of the Committee for Ethics, the Environment and Sustainable Development (since 2016)
 Linde, Member of the supervisory board (since 2011)
 Deutsche Börse, Member of the supervisory board (2016–2019), Member of the Nomination and Strategy Committees
 Metro AG, Member of the supervisory board (2011–2017)
 Vontobel, Member of the Board of Directors (2009–2013)
 Depfa Bank, Member of the supervisory board (1996–2001)

Non-profit organizations 
 German Startups Association, Member of the Board of Trustees (since 2019)
 Ifo Institute for Economic Research, Member of the Board of Trustees
 Trilateral Commission, Member of the European Group
 World Economic Forum (WEF), Member of the Europe Policy Group (since 2017)
 Fraunhofer Society, Member of the Senate (2008–2013)
 Rationalisierungs- und Innovationszentrum der Deutschen Wirtschaft, Member of the Board of Trustees (2004–2007)

Personal life 
Achleitner is married to Paul Achleitner. They live in Munich

References 

Year of birth missing (living people)
Living people
Academic staff of the Technical University of Munich
German economists
Officers Crosses of the Order of Merit of the Federal Republic of Germany